Boychenko is a Ukrainian surname. Less common transliterations include Boichenko, Boitchenko, Bojčenko, and Bojczenko. Notable people with the surname include:

 Olha Boychenko (born 1989), Ukrainian footballer
 Pavel Boychenko (born 1975), Russian hockey player
 Sergey Boychenko (born 1977), Kazakhstani footballer
 Vadym Boychenko (born 1977), Ukrainian politician
 Valeriy Boychenko (born 1989), Ukrainian footballer

See also
 

Ukrainian-language surnames